Vasily Ivanovich Sternberg (Ukrainian: Василь Іванович Штернберґ, Russian: Василий Иванович Штернберг; (12 February 1818, Saint Petersburg - 8 September 1845, Rome) was a Russian and Ukrainian landscape and genre painter.

Biography 
His father was a mining official. He began by auditing classes at the Imperial Academy of Arts and became a full student in 1835, studying landscape painting with Maxim Vorobiev. In addition to his formal works, he was known for his delightful drawings and caricatures.

Summers were spent at the home of his patron in a region of the Ukraine known as "Little Russia". Many of his best-known works were inspired by what he saw there. Some of his works were purchased by Tsar Nicholas I as gifts for the Tsar's family. He was honored with the title of "Artist Class XIV".

From 1839 to 1840, he served in the expeditionary force to Khiva, led by General Vasily Alekseevich Perovsky. Following that, he received a fellowship from the Academy to work in Rome. He died there five years later, aged only twenty-seven.

Selected paintings

References

External links

1818 births
1845 deaths
Painters from Saint Petersburg
Russian male painters
Genre painters
19th-century painters from the Russian Empire
19th-century male artists from the Russian Empire